Mokshan is an urban locality (a work settlement) and the administrative center of Mokshansky District of Penza Oblast, Russia. Population:    10,710 (1900).

History
It was established in 1566 as a fort to protect the country from the raids of the Tatars and the Kalmyks, and is supposedly located on the site of the Meshcheryak town of Murunza mentioned as early as the 9th century. It was granted town status in 1780 and demoted to rural locality in 1925. Urban-type settlement status was granted to it in 1960.

References

External links

Unofficial website of Mokshan 

Urban-type settlements in Penza Oblast
Mokshansky Uyezd
Mokshansky District